The 1974–75 Indiana Pacers season was Indiana's eighth season in the American Basketball Association and eighth as a team.

Player notes

Roger Brown retired after this season.

After leading the Pacers to the finals, George McGinnis decided to jump to the NBA to the Philadelphia 76ers, who held his original NBA draft rights.

Draft picks

Roster

Regular season standings

Eastern Division

Western Division

Playoffs
Western Division Semifinals

Pacers win series, 4–2

Western Division Finals

Pacers win series, 4–3

ABA Finals

Pacers lose series, 4–1

References

Indiana Pacers seasons
Indiana
Indiana Pacers
Indiana Pacers